Cute is the fourth studio album by Japanese recording artist Arisa Mizuki, released through Nippon Columbia on July 21, 1995. It is predominantly a pop music album. Cute was released only seventh months after Arisa III: Look and is Mizuki's last studio album to be released under Nippon Columbia. The album produced two singles, "Anata no Sedai e Kuchizuke o", written and produced by Tetsuya Komuro, and "Dakishimete!." Both singles debuted within the top twenty, with "Anata no Sedai e Kuchizuke o" becoming Mizuki's last single to break the top ten. Despite not being released as a single, track seven, "Kagayaite Ite (10 Years After)," was used as theme song for the NHK television and radio program Minna no Uta throughout June and July 1995.

CDJournal described Cute as a "percussive summer-driven dance pop" set with "occasional slow numbers" that mesh well with Mizuki's "angelic vocals." The online magazine singled out Komuro's sole contribution to the album, "Anata no Sedai e Kuchizuke o," as the most "orthodox" track on the record. The ninth track on the album, "Pitter Patter," is written and produced by Hiroshi Matsui and Suzi Kim, who are credited under the name of their production and songwriting team Royal Mirrorball.

Cute debuted at number 21 on the Oricon Weekly Albums chart with 21,950 copies in its first week, charting three spots higher than Arisa III: Look.

Commercial performance 
Cute debuted on the Oricon Weekly Albums chart at number 21 with 21,950 copies sold in its first week. The album fell nine spots to number 30 on its second week, selling 14,080 copies, before dropping out of the top thirty the following week. The album charted for five weeks and has sold a total of 52,890 copies.

Track listing

Charts and sales

References 

1995 albums
Alisa Mizuki albums
Nippon Columbia albums
Japanese-language albums